Trilepida is a genus of snakes in the family Leptotyphlopidae.

Geographic range
Species in the genus Trilepida are native to northern South America and Panama.

Taxonomy
All of the species in the genus Trilepida were previously placed in the genus Leptotyphlops.

Species
The genus contains the following species which are recognized as being valid.
Trilepida affinis  – Venezuela blind snake 
Trilepida anthracina  – Bailey's blind snake
Trilepida brasiliensis  – Brazilian blind snake
Trilepida brevissima  – Caqueta blind snake 
Trilepida dimidiata  – dainty blind snake
Trilepida dugandi  – Dugand's blind snake
Trilepida fuliginosa 
Trilepida guayaquilensis  – Guayaquila blind snake
Trilepida jani 
Trilepida joshuai  – Joshua's blind snake
Trilepida koppesi  – Amaral's blind snake
Trilepida macrolepis  – big-scaled blind snake
Trilepida nicefori  – Santander blind snake
Trilepida pastusa 
Trilepida salgueiroi  – Espírito Santo blind snake

Nota bene: A binomial authority in parentheses indicates that the species was originally described in a genus other than Trilepida.

References

Further reading
Hedges, S. Blair (2011). "The type species of the threadsnake genus Tricheilostoma Jan revisited (Squamata, Leptotyphlopidae)". Zootaxa 3027: 63–64. (Trilepida, new genus, p. 63).

 
Snake genera